Kabua is a surname of Marshallese origin. It may refer to:

 Amata Kabua (1928–1996), first President of the Marshall Islands 
 Amatlain Elizabeth Kabua (born 1951), Marshallese diplomat and politician
 David Kabua (born 1951), eight President of the Marshall Islands 
 Emlain Kabua (born 1928), former First Lady of the Marshall Islands 
 Imata Kabua (1943–2019), second President of the Marshall Islands 
 Kabua the Great (died 1910), an Iroijlaplap of the Ralik chain of the Marshall Islands
 Kitlang Kabua (born 1991), Marshallese politician

Marshallese-language surnames